Frederick "Fred" Willis (birth unknown – death unknown) was a Welsh rugby union and professional rugby league footballer who played in the 1920s.

International honours
Fred Willis won a cap for Wales while at Batley in 1921.

References

Batley Bulldogs players
Newport RFC players
Place of birth missing
Place of death missing
Rugby league players from Newport, Wales
Rugby league props
Rugby union players from Newport, Wales
Wales national rugby league team players
Welsh rugby league players
Welsh rugby union players
Year of birth missing
Year of death missing